(sometimes misspelled as Tonenili) is the rain god of the Navajo people of Arizona and New Mexico. A deity given to having fun and playing tricks,  carries a water pot. In the tribal dances he is represented by a masked man who enacts the part of a clown. In the myths, too, he is the fool who dances about in order to show that he is pleased with what is happening. Tó Neinilii was said to often argue with the Navajo god of gambling, Nohoilpe. In times of drought or misfortune due to the weather, it was often said that Tó Neinilii had lost a bet with Nohoilpe.

 was very mischievous and liked nothing better than a good downpour at the wrong moment. His tricks never harm anyone. It was  that saved the first Navajo from the water monster .

References

Navajo mythology
Rain deities
Sky and weather gods
Trickster gods